Fatma Samba Diouf Samoura (born 9 September 1962) is a Senegalese former diplomat and senior executive. She was appointed as the first female Secretary General of FIFA by President Gianni Infantino on 13 May 2016 and assumed her post on 20 June 2016. Previously she worked in various positions at the United Nations. In 2018, Forbes ranked her Number 1 in their Most Powerful Women in International Sports list, and the BBC listed her as one of their 100 women.

Career
After joining the United Nations World Food Programme (WFP) in 1995, she served as Country Director for WFP in Djibouti and Cameroon and also worked at the WFP headquarters in Rome.  She covered numerous complex emergencies, including Kosovo, Liberia, Nicaragua, Sierra Leone, and Timor-Leste (East Timor).

On 1 November 2007, UN Secretary-General Ban Ki-moon, in consultation with the Under-Secretary-General for Humanitarian Affairs John Holmes, appointed her as Deputy Humanitarian Coordinator (DHC) for eastern Chad.  She was based in the town of Abéché, located approximately 80 kilometres west of the border with the Sudan's conflict-torn Darfur region.  Chad currently hosts over 280,000 refugees and over 170,000 internally displaced persons (IDPs), most of whom are in the eastern region, and she was tasked with working for their return.  The official's functions consist in providing support and guidance to a team composed of seven United Nations agencies and over 40 international non-governmental organizations (NGOs) working in eastern Chad.

FIFA
In June 2016 she assumed the role of FIFA Secretary General responsible for overseeing the commercial and operational side of the organization.  She replaced Markus Kattner, who was implicated in corruption. 

Within months of landing the job, a controversy erupted in the United Kingdom over the rules forbidding the wearing of  remembrance poppy symbols by players. Samoura declared on 3 November 2016 that England, Scotland and Wales would be punished if they wore the poppy on Remembrance Day, as FIFA classes it as a political symbol. "Britain is not the only country that has been suffering as a result of war", she said. "Syria is an example. My own [African] continent has been torn by war for years. The only question is 'why are we doing exceptions for just one country and not the rest of the world?'" UK Prime Minister Theresa May condemned FIFA and told Parliament that Samoura's decision was "utterly outrageous".

When  Samoura visited the AU Pavilion at the Expo 2020 Dubai in 2021, with other FIFA Officials, the AU  Expo Commissioner General, Dr. Levi Uche Madueke said of Samoura "she is a living testimony of the great human spirit that women across the African continent have, and her astute leadership should serve as a model worth replicating as we build towards the Africa we want, which involves the development of capable and credible leaders, especially amongst our women and youth”.

References 

Senegalese officials of the United Nations
Women humanitarians
1962 births
Living people
Senegalese diplomats
FIFA officials
BBC 100 Women